Vincent Paul Marie Van Quickenborne (born 1 August 1973) is a Belgian politician of the Open Flemish Liberals and Democrats who has been serving as Minister of Justice in the government of Prime Minister Alexander De Croo since 2020.

Political career 
Van Quickenborne has been Senator from 1999 to 2003, a Secretary of State (2003–2008), Minister (2008–2011) responsible for the simplification of the administration and Deputy Prime Minister and Pensions Minister (2011–2012). On 17 October 2012, he resigned as minister to become mayor of Kortrijk for the term starting in February 2013.

Van Quickenborne is also member of the municipal council of Kortrijk, where he lives nowadays.

References

External links
 
 
 kafka.be

1973 births
Living people
Government ministers of Belgium
Mayors of Kortrijk
Members of the Chamber of Representatives (Belgium)
Members of the Senate (Belgium)
Open Vlaamse Liberalen en Democraten politicians
21st-century Belgian politicians
Belgian Ministers of Justice